Theo Travis (born 7 July 1964 in Birmingham, England) is a British saxophonist, flautist and composer. He is best known for being a member of Soft Machine which he joined in 2006 while the group was still using the "Legacy" suffix and for being a member of Gong from 1999 to 2010.

Biography
Travis received his degree in music from the University of Manchester specialising in the works of Shostakovich. He has made eleven solo albums, mostly as a band leader working in the field of jazz, composing and arranging most of the material. However, 2003's Slow Life, on which he is the sole performer, is an ambient album employing loops which prefigures his later work with Travis & Fripp. He has made about the same number of albums again credited to himself and one (or occasionally more) other collaborator(s), including John Foxx and, as half of Travis & Fripp with Robert Fripp.

On his albums as band leader, Travis has played with numerous other jazz musicians. These have included, on his 2007 album Double Talk, guitarist Mike Outram and organist Pete Whittaker. There was no bassist as such on that album: like many Hammond organists, Whittaker plays the bass parts with his left hand and his left foot on the pedals. Robert Fripp also guested on two tracks on this album, one of which he co-wrote with Travis. Owing to other collaborative commitments, Travis did not record another jazz album for eight years. When he did so in 2015, he named his new band Theo Travis' Double Talk after the 2007 album. This new band again included both Outram and Whittaker, with the addition of Nic France on drums.

In 1993, Travis worked alongside bassist Dave Sturt on the Jade Warrior album Distant Echoes - as they would again on that band's 2008 album NOW. It was to prove a fortuitous collaboration. The pair worked together in the four-piece jazz fusion band The Other Side, releasing the album Dangerous Days in 1994, and, since 1999, with varying guest musicians in their band Cipher which collaborated with Bill Nelson in both the latter's improvisational three-piece live band Orchestra Futura and his more conventional, seven-piece rock band Bill Nelson and the Gentlemen Rocketeers. Sturt would also serve as Mix engineer on Travis & Fripp's 2014 album Discretion.

In 2006, Travis joined Soft Machine Legacy, a project based on personnel and works of the band Soft Machine, replacing the late reedsman Elton Dean. Since 2008 he has worked with guitarist Robert Fripp in the duo Travis and Fripp, releasing four CDs to date, as well as three live concerts as downloads through DGMLive (two of them also on vinyl through Tonefloat). Travis has also worked extensively with Steven Wilson, performing on fifteen of his records and with Wilson mixing six of Travis' releases. Travis appears extensively as featured soloist on Wilson's Grammy nominated album Grace for Drowning and is part of his touring live band. In 2014, using kickstarter funding, he self-published the book Twice Around The World: Steven Wilson Tour Blogs 2012-2013 which included entries previously published on Travis' Facebook page, here re-edited, and was lavishly illustrated with photographs from that tour.

In April 2019 it was announced that Travis would be filling in for Bill Rieflin on the King Crimson 50th Anniversary Celebration Tour as keyboardist. However, on 3 May it was announced by Robert Fripp that Travis would no longer be joining the band.

Travis has also worked with Harold Budd, Bass Communion, Burnt Friedman, Gong, No-Man, Porcupine Tree, The Tangent, Dave and Richard Sinclair, David Sylvian and David Gilmour.

He is of significance to the genres of jazz, ambient music and progressive rock.

He lives in London with his wife and son.

Awards
Travis' album View From the Edge was voted Best British Jazz CD of 1994 by a Jazz on CD Critics/Readers poll.

Discography

Solo albums
2am (1993) 33 Jazz
View From the Edge (1994) "Best British Jazz CD 1994" 33 Jazz
Secret Island (1996) 33 Jazz
Passion Dance - Live at Ronnie's (1999) [Theo Travis Quartet] RSJH - Ronnie Scott's Jazz House
Heart of the Sun (2001) 33 Jazz
Slow Life (2003) Ether Sounds
Earth to Ether (2004) 33 Jazz
View From the Edge (Deluxe Edition) (2004) contains 2nd CD with alternative takes and remixes 33 Jazz
Double Talk (2007) 33 Jazz
Fear Falls Burning - The Tonefloat Sessions (2009) vinyl only Tonefloat
Transgression (2015) [Theo Travis' Double Talk] Esoteric Recordings
Open Air (2017) vinyl only Tonefloat
Songs From the Apricot Tree (2021)

Solo Collaboration albums
 Bodywork (1998) Marshall Travis Wood:] 33 Jazz 
 Berlin Vibe (2001) [Travis/Beaujolais Quartet] Symbol
 Guerrilla Music (2002) [Theo Travis/Mark Hewins] Burning Shed
 For the Love of Open Spaces (2003) Steve Lawson/Theo Travis] Pillow Mountain
 Eleven Bowls of Acidophilus Flute Salad 2000/2001 (2006) all tracks improvised live on the Gong Zero To Infinity Tour vinyl only Tonefloat
 Thread (2008) [Travis & Fripp] Panegyric
 All Saints Church, Broad Chalke, UK live recording (21 May 2009) [Travis & Fripp] vinyl Tonefloat, download DGMLive
 St. Michael & All Saints, Bishop's Cleeve, UK live recording (22 May 2009) [Travis & Fripp] vinyl Tonefloat, download DGMLive
 Teatro Echegaray, Málaga, Spain live recording (30 April 2010) [Travis & Fripp] download only DGMLive
 Live at Coventry Cathedral (2010) [Travis & Fripp] Panegyric
 Torn Sunset (2011) [Theo Travis and John Foxx] Edsel
 Follow (2012) [Travis & Fripp] Panegyric
 Discretion (2014) [Travis & Fripp] Panegyric
 Windjammer (2014) [Echo Engine with Theo Travis] Blue Serene Focus

Solo Compilation albums
All I Know (2010) 33 Jazz

with Soft Machine
Studio
 Steam (as Soft Machine Legacy) (2007) Moonjune
 Burden of Proof (as Soft Machine Legacy) (2013) Moonjune
 Hidden Details (2018) Moonjune
Live
 Live Adventures (as Soft Machine Legacy) (2010) Moonjune
 Live At The Baked Potato (2020) Tonefloat

Collaboration albums
 Distant Echoes (1993) Jade Warrior Red Hot
 Dangerous Days (1994) [The Other Side] Bridge 
 Celtic Steppes (1996) Dick Heckstall-Smith 33 Jazz 
 Gaddy Zerbib (1996) [Gaddy Zerbib] Zerbib
 Under African Skies (1996) [Jive Nation] Bridge 
 Truth (1997) Sugizo Polygram/Cross
 _ism (1998) Jansen Barbieri Karn (JBK)] Medium Productions Limited
 Forest People (1998) Masami Tsuchiya Polygram/Cross
 Bass Communion (1998) Bass Communion 3rd Stone
 Indigo Falls (1998) Indigo Falls (Medium Productions Limited)
 It's out there (1998) [The Great Unknown] Infinity 
 Stupid Dream (1999) Porcupine Tree Kscope
 Bass Communion 2 (1999) [Bass Communion] Hidden Art
 Pulse (1999) Yukihiro Takahashi/Steve Jansen Con - Sipio
 No Ordinary Man (1999) Cipher Hidden Art
 Zero to Infinity (2000) Gong Snapper Music
 Live 2 Infinitea (2000) [Gong] Snapper Music
 Beloved (2001) Akiko Kobayashi Warner Japan
 Smiling and Waving (2001) Anja Garbarek Virgin Norway
 Playing in a room with people (2001) [Jansen Barbieri Karn (JBK)] live album Medium Productions Limited
 Recordings (2001) [Porcupine Tree] Kscope/Snapper Music
 Bass Communion 3 (2001) [Bass Communion] Burning Shed
 Solar Sahara (2001) [Recreator] FMR
 Lost Songs, Volume One (2001) No-Man Burning Shed
 Returning Jesus (2001) [No-Man] 3rd Stone
 Blake (2001) [Rod Blake] Candid
 Tito Rides In (2001) [Tito Lopez Combo] Acid Jazz
 One Who Whispers (2002) [Cipher] Gliss
 OK Friends (2002) [Gong] Gas
 From Here to Eternity (2-CD reissue) (2002) [Gong] Snapper Music
 Into the Sun (2003) David Sinclair DSINCS-Music
 Full Circle (2003) [David Sinclair] DSINCS-Music
 Meditations (2003) Uri Geller Forkbender
 Words of Courage and Inspiration (2003) [Uri Geller] Forkbender
 The Sky Moves Sideways Reissue (2003) [Porcupine Tree] Delerium 
 House of Thandoy (2003) [House of Thandoy] Not On Label - HOT1 CDr only
 Harbans Srih's Vybesmen (2003) [Harbans Srih's Vybesmen] Tito 
 Bass Communion remixed (2003) [Bass Communion / Various] Headphone Dust
 All that you are (2003) [No-Man] Hidden Art EP
 Surfacing (2004) [A Marble Calm] Burning Shed
 The World That We Drive Through (2004) The Tangent Inside Out
 Unreleased Electronic Music Volume 1 (2004) Steven Wilson Headphone Dust
 Ghosts on magnetic tape (2004) [Bass Communion] Headphone Dust
 Still Smokin'  (2004) Tito Lopez Combo Tito's 
 Taste (2004) [Karen Lane] 33 Jazz 
 Elemental Forces (2005) [Cipher] Burning Shed
 Snow Bourne Sorrow (2005) [Nine Horses (David Sylvian/Steve Jansen/Burnt Friedman)] SamadhiSound
 Indicates Void (2005) [Bass Communion] vinyl only Tonefloat
 A Place in the Queue (2006) [The Tangent] Inside Out
 So Many Reasons (2006) John Lester Midnite Cafe
 Stupid Dream (2006) [Porcupine Tree] Special Edition 2-CD set Lava/Atlantic
 Where You Go (2007) Cary Grace Door 13 Music
 Who's the Boss in the Factory? (2008) Karmakanic Inside Out
 NOW (2008) [Jade Warrior] Windweaver Music
 Not as Good as the Book (2008) [The Tangent] Inside Out
 Schoolyard Ghosts (2008) [No-Man] Kscope/Snapper Music
 Pacific Codex (2008) [Bass Communion] Headphone Dust
 Still Life in Mobile Homes (2009) Francis Dunnery Aquarian Nation 
 2032 (2009) [Gong] (G-Wave)
 A Rose (2009) [Stefano Panunzi] Emerald Recordings 
 the seven dreams (2010) [goldbug] 1K Recordings
 Grace for Drowning (2011) [Steven Wilson] Kscope
 Catalogue / Preserve / Amass (Live In Europe, October 2011) (2012) [Steven Wilson] Headphone Dust, Kscope
 The Raven that Refused to Sing (And Other Stories) (2013) [Steven Wilson] Kscope
 Nacaal (2014) [goldbug] 1K Recordings
 Hand. Cannot. Erase. (2015) [Steven Wilson] Kscope
 Dreams And Absurdities (2015) Dave Sturt Esoteric/Antenna
 Until All The Ghosts Are Gone (2015) Anekdoten VIRTA

Collaboration singles and EPs
Piano Lessons c/w Ambulance Chasing (1999) [Porcupine Tree] Kscope
Stranger by the minute c/w Even Less (pt 2) (2000) [Porcupine Tree] Kscope
Les Pensées De Nos Rêves EP (2002) [Inconnu] (Over Records)

Collaboration DVDs
High above the Subterranea Club 2000 (2002) [Gong] live album Snapper Music
Classic Rock Magazine Legends filmed live at Metropolis Studios (2011) Bill Nelson and the Gentlemen Rocketeers] ITV Studios Home Entertainment
The Raven that Refused to Sing (And Other Stories) CD+DVD (2013) [Steven Wilson] Kscope

Tracks on Solo albums
"Psychogroove Reconstruction/Remix" [Cipher] on View From the Edge (Deluxe Edition) 2nd CD with alternative takes and remixes (2004) 33 Jazz Records

Tracks on Collaboration albums
  "Life Without Buildings" live, also features Steven Wilson on Medium Label Sampler (2000) [Jansen Barbieri Karn (JBK)] Medium Productions Limited
 The DAC Mixes (2003) [Darkroom] CDr Burning Shed
 "Sleepyard", "Gap Of Cloud", "A Way Of Disappearing", "Ballad Of A Deadman" and "Conversation Over" on Slope (2007) Steve Jansen SamadhiSound

Tracks on Compilation albums
'three breaths' on Under The External (1997) [Ute] Id/Mercury Polygram
"Lulworth Night" on Velvet Smooth Moods 2 (1999) [Various Artists] Jazz FM Records
"Like A Child" [No-Man] and "White Cloud, Blue Sky" [Cipher] on The Sky Goes All The Way Home (1999) [Various Artists]  Voiceprint
"Drugged" remix [Bass Communion] on Remixes (2000) [Silver Apples] 3rd Stone
DJ Spooky and Steve Jansen tracks on Pulse + Pulse Remix (2000) [Yukihiro Takahashi, Steve Jansen] Medium Productions Limited
"The Lodger pt 2" [Cipher] exclusive track plus "16 Second Swarm" [Bass Communion], "No Ordinary Man" [Cipher] on Hidden Art Sampler (2000) [Various] Hidden Art
"Quantico" [Bass Communion] on Invisible Soundtracks Macro 3 (2000) [Various] Leaf
"Slow Life" [Theo Travis/Mark Hewins] on Burning Shed - Sampler Two (2002) [Various] CDr Burning Shed

Tracks on Compilation 12"
"All Things" [Aphratec] on The Discerning Dancefloor - Volume One (2002) [Various] vinyl only Care in the Community Records

Bibliography
Travis, Theo Twice Around The World: Steven Wilson Tour Blogs 2012-2013 (2014) includes entries previously published on Travis' Facebook page, here re-edited self-published

Filmography
 2015: Romantic Warriors III: Canterbury Tales (DVD)

References

External links
Official Site
Bio at TheoTravis.com
[ All Music]
Cipher
Interview on The Next Track podcast

1964 births
Musicians from Birmingham, West Midlands
British jazz saxophonists
British male saxophonists
Canterbury scene
Alumni of the University of Manchester
Living people
The Tangent members
Gong (band) members
21st-century saxophonists
21st-century British male musicians
British male jazz musicians
Curfew (band) members